Enrico De Maria (born 20 December 1976 in Rüti) is a Swiss Olympic Star class sailor. He has been crewing for Flavio Marazzi in the 2004, 2008 and 2012 Summer Olympics and finished fourth in the 2004 edition.

He was a grinder on Alinghi during the 2003 America's Cup.

References

External links 
 
 
 

1976 births
Living people
Swiss male sailors (sport)
People from Hinwil District
Olympic sailors of Switzerland
Sailors at the 2004 Summer Olympics – Star
Sailors at the 2008 Summer Olympics – Star
Sailors at the 2012 Summer Olympics – Star
Alinghi sailors
2003 America's Cup sailors
Star class sailors
5.5 Metre class sailors
World Champions in 5.5 Metre
World champions in sailing for Switzerland
Sportspeople from the canton of Zürich
21st-century Swiss people